George Arthur Mathews (June 4, 1852 – April 19, 1941) was an American lawyer of Brookings, South Dakota.  He was active in the government of the Dakota Territory, and was a territorial delegate to the United States House of Representatives.

Mathews was born in Potsdam, St. Lawrence County, New York, and studied law at Upper Iowa University, Fayette, Iowa, and the University of Iowa at Iowa City.  He was admitted to the bar in 1878 and commenced practice in Corning, Iowa.

He moved to Brookings, Dakota Territory (now South Dakota) in 1879.  In 1884 he became prosecuting attorney of the fifth judicial circuit for the Territory of Dakota. This automatically made him a member of the Territorial council, and he was its President in 1887 and 1888. In 1888 he was elected as a Republican to be the Territorial delegate to the U.S. House, but served only from March 4, 1889, until November 2, 1889, when North and South Dakota were admitted into the Union.

Mathews returned home to the private practice of law, although he did serve as mayor of the city of Brookings from 1897–1903.  In 1910 he retired and moved to Los Angeles, California. When he died there in 1941 he was cremated and his ashes deposited in Greenwood Cemetery at Brookings, South Dakota.

External links

1852 births
1941 deaths
People from Potsdam, New York
Mayors of places in South Dakota
Members of the Dakota Territorial Legislature
19th-century American politicians
Delegates to the United States House of Representatives from Dakota Territory
University of Iowa alumni
South Dakota lawyers
North Dakota lawyers
People from Brookings, South Dakota